Charles Richard Ogden (February 6, 1791 – February 19, 1866) was a Joint Premier of the Province of Canada for Canada East from 1842 with William Henry Draper PM for Canada West. Odgen was a member of the Château Clique.

Ogden was a lawyer, politician, and public servant from Canada East. Born in Quebec City, he was one of eleven sons of Isaac Ogden, a loyalist and puisne judge of the Court of King's Bench at Montreal, and Sarah Hanson. He was called to the Bar of Lower Canada in 1812 and set up practice at Trois-Rivières. One of Ogden's brothers, Peter Skene Ogden, was a noted explorer and fur trader who worked for the North West Company and the Hudson's Bay Company.

Charles Richard Ogden was first elected to the Legislative Assembly of Lower Canada for Trois-Rivières in 1814 and was its representative until he was defeated in the general election of 1824, while he was in England. He was reelected in 1826 and served until 1833 when he was named attorney general for Lower Canada; he continued in that post until 1842. As Attorney-General, Ogden prosecuted the "Patriotes" who had been involved in the 1837 rebellion, 12 of whom were hanged.

He also served as a member of the Special Council of Lower Canada from 1840 until the Act of Union. He was elected again for Trois-Rivières in the Legislative Assembly of the Province of Canada in 1841.

Ogden's leadership as premier in supporting the Act of Union, and the rise of the reformers under Baldwin and Lafontaine, reduced his political popularity. This, combined with his involvement in prosecuting the Patriotes, left his reputation and standing among the French-Canadian population diminished.

A complicated man, Ogden was known to be very popular among his constituents for his fluent French, his oratory and his sense of humour.  He was notorious for his practical jokes, one of which was to paint moustaches on the sleeping passengers of a ship travelling from Montreal to Quebec City.

Ogden left for England near the end of 1841 and returned to Canada for a while in 1842 before going back to England again, living in a kind of exile. He became a member of the English bar at Lincoln's Inn in 1844 and was named attorney general for the Isle of Man. He died near Liverpool in 1866.

External links
 

Members of the Legislative Assembly of Lower Canada
Members of the Legislative Assembly of the Province of Canada from Canada East
Pre-Confederation Quebec people
Premiers of the Province of Canada
1791 births
1866 deaths
Attorneys-General of Lower Canada